Ceriana tridens is a species of syrphid fly in the family Syrphidae.

References

Eristalinae
Articles created by Qbugbot
Taxa named by Hermann Loew
Insects described in 1872
Hoverflies of North America